Ream Andaeuk Commune is a khum (commune) in Kiri Vong District, Takéo Province, Cambodia.

Administration 
As of 2019, Ream Andaeuk Commune has 8 phums (villages) as follows.

References 

Communes of Takéo province
Kiri Vong District